The Buick Sport Wagon was a mid-size station wagon built by Buick and was shared with the Oldsmobile Vista Cruiser, Pontiac Tempest Safari and Chevrolet Chevelle Greenbrier. Featuring a raised roof and skylights over the cargo and second seat area, this model was an extended wheelbase version of the Buick Skylark station wagon. Buick Sport Wagons were built in three generations, spanning 1964–67, 1968–69, and 1970–72. During this time period, this was the only luxury level station wagon offered under the Buick model line until 1970 when the Buick Estate Wagon was returned as a full-size station wagon.

1964–1967 Series 4200/4300 (1964) Series 44200/44400 (1965-67)
An innovative model was introduced on February 4, 1964. Using the new GM A platform (RWD) the Sport Wagon used a  wheelbase, that was  longer than the other Skylark four-door sedans and coupes. The 1964 to 1967 Sport Wagons had a standard skyroof that consisted of four tinted glass panels surrounding the elevated section of the roof over the cargo area that was earlier introduced in 1954 on the GMC Scenicruiser Bus. The traditional three VentiPorts remained denoting its junior Buick model status. 

The  Buick V6 was standard with a three speed manual transmission, or the optional two speed Super Turbine 300 automatic. The  Buick V8 was optional. 

A forward-facing third row of seats was optional. Sport Wagons were available in standard and more upscale "Custom" trim package and beginning in 1966 it revived the long-standing tradition offering the woodgrain using DI-NOC a vinyl wood-grained wrap appearance. The listed retail price for the nine-passenger Sport Wagon with Custom trim package was US$3,286 ($ in  dollars ).

1968–1969 Series 43400/44400
A body redesign for all 1968 Buicks featured an updated "Sweepspear" side sculpturing that showed influences from the restyled Riviera, while the wagon's roof replaced the previously-used split main skylight with a one-piece skylight over the second-row seat, which carried over to 1969. The lengthwise skylights along the cargo area remained the same and the simulated woodgrain paneling was offered optionally. The SportWagon was offered as the Skylark Series 43400 and the Skylark Custom Series 44400 included the woodgrain appearance, and was applied below the "Sweepspear" character line for 1968 and above for 1969.
 
The 1968–69 Sport Wagon models rode on a  wheelbase.  This allowed for optional third row seats that was not available on the smaller  wheelbase Special and DeLuxe wagons. In 1969, the "Dual-Action" tailgate was introduced as an option on two-row models and standard equipment on three-row. The listed retail price for the 1968 nine-passenger Sport Wagon with Custom trim package was US$3,869 ($ in  dollars ).

Engine choices offered the standard  Chevrolet Straight-six engine, and included the  Buick V8 shared with the Skylark line and a  Buick V8 "big block" also available from the GS series.

1970–1971 Series 43400 
In 1970, the mid-sized Buick models were redesigned. From 1970 to 1971, the Sport Wagon became a deluxe trim version of the similar, less expensive Buick Skylark wagon and was the junior wagon to the full-sized Buick Estate Wagon while the Buick Special, including the station wagon, was discontinued. The distinctive skylights were not offered beginning in 1970 and the Sport Wagons were now built on the  wheelbase shared with four-door sedans. The skylight was still available on the Oldsmobile Vista Cruiser until 1972.

The engine choices remained the standard  Chevrolet Straight-six engine, or the  Buick V8 shared with the Skylark line.

1978–1980

While no longer a standalone model, a Sport Wagon package was available on the Century wagon from 1978 until 1980. It included different exterior trim like a different grille with body color inserts, special paint treatment, sport wheels and sport suspension.

Production
Station wagons were manufactured as both Buick Special and Buick Special Deluxe separately using the Sport Wagon platform but were not identified or counted as Sport Wagons in production totals and Sport Wagons were manufactured without the second row skylight feature beginning in 1970.

References 
 Inline

 General

External links

Sport Wagon
Station wagons
Cars introduced in 1964